Pavine is an alkaloid found in a variety of plants in four families, Papaveraceae, Berberidaceae, Lauraceae, and Ranunculaceae.

The elucidation of its chemical structure was reported in 1955.

The N-methyl derivative of pavine is argemonine.

See also
 Isopavine, a related alkaloid

References 

Benzylisoquinoline alkaloids
Alkaloids found in Papaveraceae
Methoxy compounds